The Quartet on the Middle East or Middle East Quartet, sometimes called the Diplomatic Quartet or Madrid Quartet or simply the Quartet, is a foursome of nations and international and supranational entities involved in mediating the Israeli–Palestinian peace process. The Quartet comprises the United Nations, the United States, the European Union, and Russia. The group was established in Madrid in 2002, recalling Madrid Conference of 1991, as a result of the escalating conflict in the Middle East.

In 2002, the Quartet established the Office of the Quartet in East Jerusalem to take "tangible steps on the ground to advance the Palestinian economy and preserve the possibility of a two state solution." Kito de Boer was the head of the Office from January 2015 to June 2017, assuming the position after the resignation of Tony Blair. The objective of the head of the Office is to promote the Quartet's strategy on Palestinian economic and institutional empowerment, including matters concerning rule of law and economic development, as well as movement and access. The current head of the Office is John N. Clarke.

On 23 March 2021, the Quartet discussed the reviving of "meaningful negotiations" between Israel and the Palestinians who both need "to refrain from unilateral actions that make a two-state solution more difficult to achieve."

History 
The initiative to establish the Quartet evolved following the outbreak of the Second Intifada in September 2000 and the futile cease-fire attempts that followed. On October 25, 2001, representatives of the EU, UN and the US and Russian governments met Palestinian leader Yasser Arafat and jointly expressed support for his policy of implementing cease-fire and security reforms in the Palestinian Authority. During the Israeli incursions into Palestinian areas in April 2002, the representatives of the same four entities met in Madrid and again called for implementation of cease-fire agreements brokered by the US government before. In the same meeting, they also agreed to transform their quadripartite cooperation into a permanent forum for follow-up of the Israeli-Palestinian peace process.

Special Envoys 
James Wolfensohn, the former president of the World Bank, was appointed Special Envoy for Israel's disengagement from Gaza in April 2005.  He stepped down the following year because of restrictions in dealing with the Islamic militant group Hamas and the withholding of money from the Palestinian Authority, risking its collapse.

Tony Blair announced that he had accepted the position of the official envoy of the Quartet, the same day he resigned as Prime Minister of the United Kingdom and as a Member of Parliament on 27 June 2007. The approval came after initial objections by Russia. The United Nations were overseeing the finances and security of his mission, before his resignation on 27 May 2015.

The special envoy from November 2015 to January 2017 was the Dutch national Kito de Boer.

John N. Clarke was appointed as special envoy on 17 January 2018. He previously held the position as deputy head of mission.

Peace efforts and actions 
Tony Blair periodically travelled to the Middle East following his appointment as Special Envoy. On a trip there in March 2008, he met with Israeli leaders to discuss recent violence. A planned meeting between Israeli and Palestinian businessmen was postponed due to recent fighting. In May 2008 Blair announced a new plan for peace and for Palestinian rights, based heavily on the ideas of the Peace Valley plan.

In an August 2009 interview, Blair said that he would like to see Hamas and Hezbollah included in peace talks but under the right conditions, that religious leaders should be more involved in the peace process, and that resolving the conflict could be easier than it was in Northern Ireland.

In a speech given in Israel on August 24, 2010, Blair sharply criticised the campaign of "delegitimization" being carried out by enemies of Israel and proponents of the Palestinians, which refuses to grant Israel its legitimate right to its own point of view and self-defense.  "Don't apply rules to the Government of Israel that you would never dream of applying to your own country," he said.  He characterized such double standards and prejudice as being an "affront to humanity" which "it is a democratic duty to counter."

In July 2016, the Quartet reported:The continuing policy of settlement construction and expansion in the West Bank and East Jerusalem, designation of land for exclusive Israeli use, and denial of Palestinian development, including the recent high rate of demolitions, is steadily eroding the viability of the two-state solution. This raises legitimate questions about Israel’s long-term intentions, which are compounded by the statements of some Israeli ministers that there should never be a Palestinian state. In fact, the transfer of greater powers and responsibilities to Palestinian civil authority...has effectively been stopped. It was within this context that the United Nations passed Security Council Resolution 2334 in December 2016 in another bid to address the settlement question. The report was significantly altered to appease Israel and as well as urging Israel to stop its settlement policy, urged Palestine to end incitement to violence.

In a speech to the UN General Assembly in September, 2018, Mahmoud Abbas called Donald Trump's policies towards Palestinians an “assault on international law”. He said the US is “too biased towards Israel” indicating that others could broker talks and that the US could participate as a member of the Middle East peace Quartet. Abbas reiterated this position at a UN Security Council meeting on February 11, 2020.

As of 16 September 2020, the UN has not been able to gather the consensus necessary for the Quartet or a group of countries linked to the Quartet to meet. On 25 September 2020, at the UN, Abbas called for an international conference early in 2021 to “launch a genuine peace process."

On 15 February 2021, the quartet envoys met virtually and agreed to meet on a regular basis to continue their engagement. On 23 March 2021, the Quartet discussed the reviving of "meaningful negotiations" between Israel and the Palestinians who both need "to refrain from unilateral actions that make a two-state solution more difficult to achieve."

Representatives 

 Special envoy John N. Clarke
 European Union high representative Josep Borrell
 Russian foreign minister Sergei Lavrov
 United Nations Special Coordinator for the Middle East Peace Process Tor Wennesland
 United States Secretary of State Antony Blinken

Criticism and shortcomings 
Despite the significance officially attached to the Quartet's part in promoting the peace process, many of its statements are merely repetition of previous statements and no significant changes in policy by either the Israeli government or the Palestinian Authority have occurred resulting from a Quartet meeting.

The Quartet has been fiercely criticized for its ineffectiveness. When Tony Blair held the function of Quartet representative, in December 2012, Palestinian officials said that "Tony Blair shouldn't take it personally, but he should pack up his desk at the Office of the Quartet Representative in Jerusalem and go home. They said his job, and the body he represents, are ′useless, useless, useless′".

The Center for Middle East Policy said in February 2012 that "The Quartet has little to show for its decade-long involvement in the peace process. ... Having spent most of the last three years in a state of near paralysis, and having failed to dissuade the Palestinians from seeking UN membership and recognition in September 2011, the Quartet has finally reached the limits of its utility. ... The current mechanism is too outdated, dysfunctional, and discredited to be reformed. Instead of undertaking another vain attempt to 'reactivate' the Quartet, the United States, the European Union, United Nations, and Russia should simply allow the existing mechanism to go quietly into the night,".

Main sessions 
The Quartet's meetings have been held on the following dates:

 May 2, 2002
 July 16, 2002
 September 17, 2002
 December 20, 2002
 February 19, 2003
 June 22, 2003
 September 26, 2003
 December 11, 2003
 May 4, 2004
 July 7–8, 2004
 September 22, 2004
 March 1, 2005
 April 14, 2005
 May 9, 2005
 June 23, 2005
 September 20, 2005
 October 28, 2005
 December 5, 2005
 January 26, 2006
 March 30, 2006
 May 9, 2006
 June 17, 2006
 September 20, 2006
 November 15, 2006
 December 22, 2006
 February 2, 2007
 February 21, 2007
 March 21, 2007
 May 30, 2007
 June 27, 2007
 July 20, 2007
 September 23, 2007
 November 26, 2007
 December 18, 2007
 May 2, 2008
 June 24, 2008
 September 26, 2008
 November 9, 2008
 June 26, 2009
 September 24, 2009
 March 19, 2010
 May 11, 2010
 June 21, 2010
 August 20, 2010
 May 20, 2011
 July 11, 2011
 August 16, 2011
 September 23, 2011
 October 9, 2011
 October 26, 2011
 December 14, 2011
 January 3, 2012
 March 12, 2012
 April 11, 2012
 July 30, 2013
 September 27, 2013
 January 26, 2015
 February 8, 2015
 May 27, 2015
 September 9, 2015
 September 30, 2015
 October 23, 2015
 December 16/17, 2015
 February 8/9, 2016
 March 28, 2016
 July 1, 2016
 September 23, 2016
 July 13, 2017
 July 22, 2017
 September 28, 2017
 September 26, 2018
 23 December 2020 & 15 February 2021 
 March 23, 2021

See also 
 Road map for peace
 Soviet Union and the Arab–Israeli conflict
 Quartet Principles

References

External links 
 Office of the Quartet Representative
 US Mission to the UN archive of press releases pertaining to the Middle East
 UN News Focus: Middle East archive of Middle East Quartet statements
 Joint Statement by the Quartet, upon meeting in London, 1 March 2005
 Joint Statement by the Quartet, upon meeting in Moscow, 19 March 2010
 Middle East Quartet Statements U.S. State Department
 President Welcomes Quartet Principals to White House, press release from meeting of the Quartet Principals on 20 December 2002
 "Tony Blair's UN Role May Conflict with New Job with JP Morgan Chase" by Matthew Russell Lee, Inner City Press, January 10, 2008

Foreign relations of Israel
Multilateral relations of Russia
United States–Middle Eastern relations
European Union and third organisations
History of the United Nations
Arab–American relations
Israeli–Palestinian peace process